Hugh II ( 1106 – 1134), also called Hugh du Puiset, was a Crusader and the Count of Jaffa. He revolted against King Fulk of Jerusalem in 1134.

Arrival in the kingdom
Hugh was the son of Hugh I of Jaffa and his wife Mamilia (or Mabilla). According to William of Tyre, his father had come to Jerusalem on a pilgrimage during the reign of Baldwin II, and Hugh was born in Apulia during the journey. However, according to John L. La Monte, it is more likely that Hugh I came to the east with Bohemund of Taranto in 1106. In any case, Hugh I was named Count of Jaffa after his arrival (by Baldwin I, if in 1106), but soon died.

When Hugh II came of age he arrived in Jerusalem to claim his inheritance, and married Emelota (or Emma), niece of the Patriarch Arnulf of Chocques. Hugh was a relative of Queen Melisende, King Fulk's wife, as their fathers Hugh I and Baldwin II were cousins; Melisende's grandmother, also named Melisende, was a sister of Hugh's grandmother Alice. Hugh had a close relationship with Melisende, but he "...was rumoured to be on too familiar terms with the queen..." (William of Tyre, 14.16) and came into conflict with a jealous Fulk. It was also rumoured that Hugh was simply arrogant and refused to pay homage to Fulk. The latter rumour also seems to the basis of the account of Orderic Vitalis; according to him, Hugh and other nobles were offended by Fulk, who brought Angevin nobles and counsellors with him when he became king, and ignored the native barons of the kingdom.

The revolt against Fulk
In 1134 Hugh seems to have revolted against Fulk, along with Roman of Le Puy, lord of Oultrejordain. According to William of Tyre, Hugh's stepson Walter I Grenier, Lord of Caesarea (Emelota's son through her first marriage to Eustace Grenier) accused Hugh of treason and conspiracy at a meeting of the Haute Cour; Walter possibly did this with the urging of Fulk himself. Hugh denied the charges, and it was decided that the matter would be settled by judicial combat. When the appointed day arrived, Hugh did not appear, and he was found guilty in absentia.

He allied with the Egyptian city of Ascalon, and Fulk invaded Jaffa and besieged the city. Hugh's rear-vassals, including Baldwin of Ramla and Barisan, constable of Jaffa, deserted him and "wisely betook themselves to the king." (William of Tyre, 14.16) The usual punishment for such actions was permanent exile and confiscation of the rebel's territories, but in this case, perhaps due to Hugh's high status in the kingdom and his relationship with the queen, the Patriarch William mediated in the dispute, and Hugh was exiled for only three years.

Attempted assassination

Hugh was free to remain in Jerusalem while waiting for a ship to take him into exile. One day, while playing dice on the street, he was brutally attacked by a Breton knight. The knight was quickly apprehended and convicted:

Rumours spread that Fulk himself had hired the knight to assassinate Hugh, and public opinion considered Hugh to be innocent of the charges of treason and conspiracy. Fulk ordered "...that the tongue should not be included among the members so mutilated", supposedly so that he would not be accused of trying to silence the knight. In any case, the knight claimed to have acted on his own:

Nevertheless Fulk no longer had the support of the public in the dispute.

Hugh remained in the kingdom for a short time, while his wounds healed. He then went into exile in Apulia, where his relative Roger II of Sicily named him Count of Gargan. Hugh never fully recovered, and died soon after his arrival.

Aftermath
Whether or not Fulk hired the Breton knight, he has been suspected, by Hans Mayer and other historians, of inciting Hugh to revolt so that he might take personal control of Jaffa. Because Hugh died before his three years of exile were over, his territories were confiscated and added to the royal domain, where they remained for the rest of the 12th century. Fulk began to build numerous castles in the area, including Ibelin, to defend against Egyptian invasions. As a consequence of the revolt, the former rear-vassals of Jaffa became more powerful, such as Ramla. The lords of Ibelin and Ramla would become important in the affairs of the kingdom later in the century.

The dispute also led to a rift between Fulk and Melisende. Melisende, who legally ruled the kingdom in her own right with Fulk as consort, was supported by the Church and various other nobles, and Fulk and his supporters in the dispute for a time felt unwelcome and even unsafe. According to William of Tyre, "from that day forward, the king became so uxorious that...not even in unimportant cases did he take any measures without her knowledge and assistance." (William of Tyre, 14.18)

Dating of the revolt
Hugh's revolt was previously dated to 1132, due to the evidence in William of Tyre and Arab historian Ibn al-Qalanisi. However, William's chronology is probably confused, and al-Qalanisi's references to conflicts in the kingdom probably refer to those between Fulk and Pons of Tripoli in 1132. Hugh appears as count of Jaffa in charters dated to 1133 and 1134, and the date of 1134 is now accepted by most scholars.

Notes

Sources
William of Tyre, A History of Deeds Done Beyond the Sea, Volume II. Trans. Emily Atwater Babcock and A. C. Krey. Columbia University Press, 1943.
John L. La Monte, Feudal Monarchy in the Latin Kingdom of Jerusalem, 1100–1291. Mediaeval Academy of America, 1932.
John L. La Monte, The Lords of Le Puiset on the Crusades. Speculum 17 (1942).
Hans Mayer, Studies in the History of Queen Melisende of Jerusalem. Dumbarton Oaks Papers 26 (1972).
Steven Tibble, Monarchy and Lordships in the Latin Kingdom of Jerusalem, 1099–1291. Clarendon Press, 1989.

1100s births
1134 deaths
Christians of the Crusades
Medieval rebels
Counts of Jaffa and Ascalon
Assassinated nobility
12th-century French people